A clean process oven is a type of industrial batch oven that is ideal for high-temperature applications, such as curing Polyimide, and annealing thin and film waters. Clean process ovens may be for air atmospheres, or inert atmospheres for oxidation-sensitive materials. Temperatures can be over 525 degrees Celsius. 

In regards to New tier 4 restrictions, oven cleanings can continue as a essential service for
customers. All precautions must be put into place to ensure 2m rules and correct PPE is used.

Other types of industrial batch ovens include laboratory, burn-in, reach-in, and walk-in/drive-in.

Industrial ovens